is a Japanese voice actress and singer from Toyama Prefecture. She is affiliated with 81 Produce. Beginning her career as a voice actress in 2012, her first main role was Naru Sekiya, the protagonist of the 2014 anime series Hanayamata. She is also known for her roles as Mira Yurisaki in Dimension W, Hane Sakura in Bakuon!!, Mallow in Pokémon: Sun & Moon, Shiori Shinomiya in Sakura Quest, and Akane Shinjō in SSSS.Gridman. She was one of the recipients of the Best New Actress Award in the 9th Seiyu Awards in 2015. She released a mini-album in 2016, and her first solo single in 2018.

Biography
Ueda was born in Toyama Prefecture on January 17, 1994. From an early age, she had an interest in performing, joining her school's theater club in elementary. While a member of her junior high school's theater club, she became interested in becoming a voice actress after interacting with a club member who wanted to pursue that profession. She decided to become a voice actor because, among other reasons, she wanted to change her personality. During her third year of high school, she applied for a voice acting audition only three days before the deadline of it.

Ueda won the Second Class Grand Prix in an audition held by the agency 81 Produce in 2011, and formally joined the agency the following year. Her first role was in the anime series Inazuma Eleven: Chrono Stone. She also became part of the voice actor unit Anisoni∀ together with three other 81 Produce newcomers: Rie Takahashi, Chiyeri Hayashida, and Kayoto Tsumita. In 2013, she voiced 18 sisters in the anime series Tesagure! Bukatsu-mono.

In 2014, Ueda was cast in her first main role as Naru Sekiya, the protagonist of the anime series Hanayamata; she and her co-stars performed the series' opening theme  under the name Team Hanayamata. The following year, she was cast as Meika Katai in Mikagura School Suite, Mikan Akemi in My Monster Secret, and Elena Arshavina in World Break: Aria of Curse for a Holy Swordsman. She was also one of three recipients of the Best New Actress Award at the 9th Seiyu Awards.

In 2016, Ueda played the role of Hane Sakura, the protagonist of the anime series Bakuon!!; she and her co-stars performed the show's ending theme . She was also cast as Lily Shirogane in Aikatsu Stars!, Mira Yurisaki in Dimension W, Sophie Noelle in Kuromukuro, and Mallow in Pokémon: Sun & Moon. That same year, she made her debut as a singer, releasing the mini-album RefRain on December 21.

In 2017, Ueda played the roles of Hiromi Maiharu in Minami Kamakura High School Girls Cycling Club and Shiori Shinomiya in Sakura Quest. She also made an appearance at New Jersey's AnimeNEXT event in April.

In 2018, she played the roles of Arthur Pendragon in Märchen Mädchen and Akane Shinjō in SSSS.Gridman. She also released her first solo single "Sleepland" on February 7, 2018; the title track is used as the ending theme to Märchen Mädchen.

In 2019, she was cast as Miyako Hoshino in Wataten!: An Angel Flew Down to Me and Gray in The Case Files of Lord El-Melloi II: Rail Zeppelin Grace Note.

In 2020, she voiced Shuka Karino in Darwin's Game. She also released her second single  on October 21, 2020; the title track was used as the opening theme to the anime series Wandering Witch: The Journey of Elaina.

Filmography

Anime television series
2012
Inazuma Eleven: Chrono Stone
Jormungand Perfect Order, Elena Baburin

2013
Cardfight!! Vanguard: Link Joker Hen, Iwase, Maki Nagashiro
Inazuma Eleven GO Galaxy, Katra Paige
Infinite Stratos 2, Shizune Takatsuki
Tesagure! Bukatsu-mono, Mobuko Sonota and other following sisters
Tamagotchi! Miracle Friends, Claricetchi

2014
Cardfight!! Vanguard: Legion Mate-Hen, Alice Carey
Cross Ange: Rondo of Angel and Dragon, Tanya Zabirova
Go-go Tamagotchi!, Lamertchi, Suzune
Hanayamata, Naru Sekiya
One Week Friends, Ōta
Rail Wars!, Tomomi Ōito
Terror in Resonance, Haruka Shibazaki
Tesagure! Bukatsu-mono Encore, Mobuko Sonota
Tokyo Ghoul, Jiro, Hideyoshi Nagachika (child), Taguchi, Misato Gori
When Supernatural Battles Became Commonplace, Naoe Hagiura

2015
Aikatsu!, Yayoi Hanawa
Anti-Magic Academy: The 35th Test Platoon, Ōka Ōtori
Blood Blockade Battlefront, Neyka
Hacka Doll the Animation, Hacka Doll #4
Mikagura School Suite, Meika Katai
My Monster Secret, Mikan Akemi
PriPara, Ajimi Kiki
Rolling Girls, Momo Fujiwara
Tesagure! Bukatsu-mono: Spin-off Puru Purun Sharumu to Asobō, Mobuko Sonota
Tokyo Ghoul √A, Jiro, Misato Gori, Shizuku Kawakami
World Break: Aria of Curse for a Holy Swordsman, Elena Arshavina

2016
Aikatsu Stars!, Lily Shirogane
Bakuon!!, Hane Sakura
Dimension W, Mira Yurisaki
Kuromukuro, Sophie Noelle
Pocket Monsters: Sun & Moon, Maō (Mallow)
PriPara, Jululu, Jewlie, Ajimi Kiki
ReLIFE, An Onoya
Scorching Ping Pong Girls, Kumami Tsukinowa

2017
ID-0, Alice
Idol Incidents, Sachie Kondō
Idol Time PriPara, Mimiko Jigoku
Land of the Lustrous, Hemimorphite
Little Witch Academia, Jasminka Antonenko, Marjolaine (ep. 13)
Minami Kamakura High School Girls Cycling Club, Hiromi Maiharu
Recovery of an MMO Junkie, Lily
Restaurant to Another World, Adelheid
Sakura Quest, Shiori Shinomiya
Wake Up, Girls! New Chapter, Rika Takashina

2018

Caligula, μ
Comic Girls, Suzu Fūra
Ingress: The Animation, Sarah
Kakuriyo: Bed and Breakfast for Spirits, Shizuna
Märchen Mädchen, Arthur Pendragon
My Hero Academia 3, Saiko Intelli (ep. 55)
Real Girl, Sumie Ayado
Record of Grancrest War, Aishela
SSSS.Gridman, Akane Shinjō

2019
Bakugan: Battle Planet, Phaedrus 
Chidori RSC, Misa Kuroi
Demon Slayer: Kimetsu no Yaiba, Kanao Tsuyuri
Dr. Stone, Ruri
Fruits Basket, Kisa Soma
Grimms Notes The Animation, Reina, Cinderella
I'm From Japan, Komachi Yuze
Kakegurui xx, Rumia Uru
Real Girl 2nd Season, Sumie Ayado
The Case Files of Lord El-Melloi II: Rail Zeppelin Grace Note, Gray
Wasteful Days of High School Girls, Kohaku Kujyo
Wataten!: An Angel Flew Down to Me, Miyako Hoshino

2020
Adachi and Shimamura, Taeko Nagafuji
Asteroid in Love, Moe Suzuya
Bakugan: Armored Alliance, Phaedrus
Darwin's Game, Shuka Karino
Kaguya-sama: Love Is War?, Kyoko Ootomo
Listeners, Janis
The Millionaire Detective Balance: Unlimited, Mahoro Saeki
Wandering Witch: The Journey of Elaina, Doll Shopkeeper

2021
Back Arrow, Annie
Backflip!!, Ayumi Futaba
Blue Reflection Ray, Mio Hirahara
Dr. Stone: Stone Wars, Ruri
Hortensia Saga, Nonnoria Folley
How a Realist Hero Rebuilt the Kingdom, Juna Doma
Mushoku Tensei: Jobless Reincarnation, Ariel Anemoi Asura
Night Head 2041, Yui Akiyama
Takt Op. Destiny, Hell
The Saint's Magic Power is Omnipotent, Elizabeth Ashley
The Slime Diaries: That Time I Got Reincarnated as a Slime, Apito
The World's Finest Assassin Gets Reincarnated in Another World as an Aristocrat, Dia Viekone
Tsukimichi: Moonlit Fantasy, The Goddess

2022
Aoashi,  Anri Kaidō
Bibliophile Princess, Elianna Bernstein
Black Summoner, Melfina
Bleach: Thousand-Year Blood War, Meninas McAllon
Chainsaw Man, Reze
Legend of Mana: The Teardrop Crystal, Florina
Parallel World Pharmacy, Eléonore "Ellen" Bonnefoi
Raven of the Inner Palace, Unkajō
Smile of the Arsnotoria the Animation, Figuray
Tomodachi Game, Maria Mizuse
World's End Harem, Shion Hoshino

2023
Chained Soldier, Sahara Wakasa
Malevolent Spirits, Yu
Mashle, Lemon Irvine
My Happy Marriage, Miyo Saimori
The Ancient Magus' Bride (season 2), Veronica Rickenbacker
Too Cute Crisis, Komachi Kokage

TBA
Ishura, Yuno the Distant Talon

Anime films

Harmonie (2014), Juri Makina
Wake Up, Girls! Beyond the Bottom (2015), Rika Takashina
Little Witch Academia: The Enchanted Parade (2015), Jasminka Antonenko
Harmony (2015), Miach Mihie
PriPara Mi~nna no Akogare Let's Go PriPari (2016), Ajimi Kiki
Godzilla: City on the Edge of Battle (2018), Maina
Godzilla: The Planet Eater (2018), Maina
Pretty Guardian Sailor Moon Eternal: The Movie -Part 1&2- (2021), CereCere/Sailor Ceres
Mobile Suit Gundam: Hathaway's Flash (2021), Gigi Andalusia
Backflip!! (2022), Ayumi Futaba
Wataten!: An Angel Flew Down to Me: Precious Friends (2022), Miyako Hoshino

Original net animations
Null & Peta (2019), Peta
 Japan Sinks: 2020 (2020), Ayumu Mutō

Video games
The Idolmaster Million Live! (2013), Umi Kōsaka
Granblue Fantasy (2014), Pengy
The Caligula Effect (2016),  μ (Mu)
Girls' Frontline (2016), Carcano M1891, Carcano M91/38
Little Witch Academia: Chamber of Time (2017), Jasminka Antonenko
Azur Lane (2017),  Izumo, Émile Bertin, Gloucester, Akane Shinjō (appeared in 2021)
SINoALICE (2017), Snow White
Idolmaster Million Live! Theater Days (2017), Umi Kōsaka
Magia Record (2017): Aimi Eri 

Kirby Star Allies (2018), Francisca
Fate/Grand Order (2019), Gray
Another Eden (2019), Ilulu
Brigandine: The Legend of Runersia (2020), Eliza Uzala
World's End Club (2020), Reycho
Rockman X Dive (2020), RiCO, iCO
Atelier Lydie & Suelle: The Alchemists and the Mysterious Paintings (2017), Lucia Borthayre
Arknights (2019), Rosa
Konosuba: Fantastic Days (2019), Rain
League of Legends, Seraphine
Digimon ReArise (2020), Bakumon
Onmyoji (2020), Sasori
Shin Megami Tensei III: Nocturne HD Remaster (2020), Chiaki Tachibana
Re:Zero − Starting Life in Another World: Lost in Memories (2020), Shion
Genshin Impact (2020), Ganyu
Project Sekai: Colorful Stage feat. Hatsune Miku (2020), Honami Mochizuki
Eden Door, Ariel
Soulworker Online, Lee Nabi
Alchemy Stars (2021), Angel
No More Heroes III (2021), Midori Midorikawa
Blue Reflection: Second Light (2021), Mio Hirahara
Paradigm Paradox (2021), Ritsu Mamiya
Soul Tide, Alisa
Gate of Nightmares (2021), Luka
Atelier Sophie 2: The Alchemist of the Mysterious Dream (2022), Elvira
Counter: Side (2022), Mika ★ Star
The Legend of Heroes: Kuro no Kiseki II – Crimson Sin (2022), Nina Fenly
Goddess of Victory: Nikke (2022), Scarlet
 Lackgirl I (2022), Sui
Fire Emblem Engage (2023), Veyle
Towa Tsugai (2023), Tsuru
Fuga: Melodies of Steel 2 (2023), Hanmna Fondant

Dubbing

Live-action
Dickinson (2019), Lavinia Norcross Dickinson

Animation
Oni: Thunder God's Tale, Amaten
Stillwater, Addy
Young Justice, Zatanna

Discography

Singles

Albums

Mini albums

References

External links
 Official agency profile 
 
  

1994 births
Living people
Anime singers
Japanese women pop singers
Japanese video game actresses
Japanese voice actresses
Lantis (company) artists
Voice actresses from Toyama Prefecture
81 Produce voice actors
21st-century Japanese actresses
21st-century Japanese women singers
21st-century Japanese singers